William Peter Gurnick is a New Zealand former professional rugby league footballer who represented New Zealand in the 1972 and 1975 World Cups.

Playing career
Gurnick won the Bert Humphries Memorial medal while playing for the Otahuhu Leopards in 1972 as the most improved forward in the Auckland Rugby League competition. He was selected for the New Zealand national rugby league team that year, making his debut against France in that year's World Cup. He missed out on New Zealand selection in 1973, but did represent Auckland. He was again picked for New Zealand in 1974 and in 1975 was included in the 1975 World Cup squad.

References

Living people
New Zealand rugby league players
New Zealand national rugby league team players
Auckland rugby league team players
Otahuhu Leopards players
Rugby league locks
Place of birth missing (living people)
Year of birth missing (living people)